Rahim Karim (born 2 February 1952) is a coach and former international Iraqi football player, who played for Al-Minaa.

Honors

Local
Al-Mina'a
 1978 Iraqi League: Champion

International
Iraq
 1977 World Military Cup: Champion

References

External links
  Iraqi national team players database
 Board members of Al-Minaa Club in 2009 
Al-Minaa Club: Sailors of south

1952 births
Living people
Iraqi footballers
Al-Mina'a SC players
Sportspeople from Basra
Iraq international footballers
Association football fullbacks
Iraqi football managers
Al-Mina'a SC managers